Third-seeded Anna Chakvetadze was able to overcome Jelena Janković to emerge the victor of the 2007 Ordina Open Women's Singles Competition.

Seeds

  Jelena Janković (final)
  Ana Ivanovic (quarterfinals)
  Anna Chakvetadze (champion)
  Dinara Safina (semifinals)
  Daniela Hantuchová (semifinals)
  Katarina Srebotnik (first round)
  Anabel Medina Garrigues (first round)
  Alona Bondarenko (Quarterfinal)

Draw

Finals

Section 1

Section 2

External links
Draws

Women's Singles
Ordina Open